Yang Jia (27 August 1980 – 26 November 2008) was a Chinese citizen executed for murdering six Shanghai police officers with a knife.

Yang received international media attention for the public sympathy accorded to him in China, where, according to exiled writer Ma Jian, Yang has become "a sort of national hero." Beijing lawyer and blogger Liu Xiaoyuan prominently defended Yang.

Background
Yang, a jobless 28-year-old Beijing resident described as a loner, was reported to have been arrested and interrogated by the Shanghai police in October 2007 for riding an unregistered bicycle.
According to his later testimony in court, he was insulted during the interrogation and beaten after being brought back to the station, leaving bruises on his arms and back. He then sued the police for maltreatment, to no avail.

Stabbings
According to Chinese authorities and media, Yang Jia ignited eight petrol bombs at the front gate of the police headquarters in Zhabei, a Shanghai suburb, at about 9:40 am, 1 July 2008 – the anniversary of the founding of the Chinese Communist Party. He then stabbed security guard Gu Jianming, who tried to stop Yang, with a knife. Subsequently, Yang charged into the building and randomly stabbed nine unarmed police officers, four in the lobby and duty room and five more while making his way up to the 21st floor, before police managed to subdue him.

Six policemen suffered stab wounds in their lungs, livers and necks and bled to death. Besides the knife and molotov cocktails, Yang carried with him a hammer, a dust mask and tear gas spray.

Trial and execution

Yang's trial was delayed on account of the 2008 Summer Olympics. On 27 August 2008, Yang was tried behind closed doors in a one-hour trial at the Shanghai No. 2 Intermediate People's Court. Four days later, the official news agency Xinhua announced that he had been found guilty of premeditated murder and received a death sentence, as had previously been expected.

The death verdict against Yang was confirmed in an appeal trial, also conducted behind closed doors, on 20 October 2008. The appeals court concluded that Yang was of sound mind.

On 21 November 2008, the Supreme People's Court of China confirmed the death verdict. Yang was executed by shooting on 26 November 2008.

Media coverage and public opinion in China
Yang initially benefited from unusually sympathetic coverage in the state-controlled Chinese press. The Beijing News pointed out that Yang's appointed lawyer, Xie Youming, might have had a conflict of interest as he is also a legal adviser for the city district that oversees the police station at issue. Southern Weekend published a long, sympathetic front-page story, while other Chinese papers hinted that Yang was wronged and demanded a fair trial. In the week leading up to the trial, though, the Shanghai media fell silent on the case and Chinese authorities increased efforts to censor Chinese internet coverage on the subject.

While there was initial public anger at the killings, Western media noted that discourse on Chinese internet forums and blogs soon became largely sympathetic to Yang, with many expressing suspicions that Yang might not receive a fair trial and that the police might want to cover up wrongdoings of their own. The Daily Telegraph quoted one Chinese blogger as praising Yang's "strong sense of the law" and another comparing him to Wu Song, a hero in Chinese literature. A message left on Yang's MySpace account was reported to have read: "You have done what most people want to do, but do not have enough courage to do."

On 13 October 2008, a public protest in support of Yang occurred outside the Shanghai court in which Yang's appeal was heard. According to Agence France-Presse, about a dozen protesters wearing T-shirts with Yang's face showed up and were arrested by police.

After his execution, Internet tributes to Yang continued to be posted in China. Agence France-Presse reported that very few Internet users expressed the opinion that Yang deserved his fate, reproducing the following contribution by a Chinese forum user as typical of many: "When you hold a knife up to the police, it's doomed to end this way. But Chinese history will remember Yang Jia's name forever."

Musical tribute

Pan Gu (盤古樂隊), an underground Chinese rock band now in exile, released a five-song album named after Yang Jia, The Knife of My Home Country (故鄉的刀). One song was named after the well-known quote of Yang's: "You [the authorities] refuse to give me an explanation, I shall give you my own explanation".

U.S. 2008 Human Rights report
The U.S. Department of State's 2008 Human Rights report mentioned Yang Jia:

See also
Weiquan movement, the Chinese civil rights movement
Deng Yujiao incident concerning another Chinese person accused of murder receiving popular support
2010 Hebei tractor rampage

References

2008 in China
Chinese mass murderers
Executed mass murderers
Chinese people convicted of murder
People convicted of murder by the People's Republic of China
Chinese people convicted of murdering police officers
21st-century executions by China
Executed People's Republic of China people
People executed for murdering police officers
1980 births
2008 deaths
Mass murder in 2008
Weiquan movement
Executed people from Beijing
People executed by China by firing squad
Executed Chinese people
Rampages
21st-century mass murder in China
Attacks on police stations in the 2000s
Mass stabbings in China